Indrachapa Liyanage (born January 13, 1982) is a Sri Lankan singer. He has completed his debut album Abinishkramanaya (renunciation), but it has not been officially released yet.

Biography
Indrachapa Liyanage was born in Colombo, Sri Lanka, on January 13, 1982, and studied at Royal College, Horana up to O/L's then Ananda College Colombo. His music career started in the year 2000, with his school mate Kasun Kalhara in their own project. They released an album called Haritha Nimnaye, and it was a very successful release, and the album introduced them to a huge fan base. But in the years of 2004 and 2005, they closed down their project and went on to each make their own music, though they continued to work together on occasion.

Lately Indrachapa has moved on to rock music and doing experiments to create a "Sri Lankan Identity" rock style. His main aim is to popularize rock music among the majority of the country. He has released a single called "Ginidal" which was his first single.

Indrachapa has performed over 20 domestic major concerts and several abroad along with other artists.

In 2010, he entered the movie industry by composing the theme song for the movie How I Wonder What You Are.

Personal life
Indrachapa is the youngest member in his family. He has three elder brothers: Saumya Liyanage Saman Liyanage and Aloka Liyanage. His father, Hemasiri Liyanage, is a veteran Sri Lankan actor.
 
Indrachapa is married to actress Samanalee Fonseka.

Discography
 Abinishkramanaya (Renunciation)
 Adaraya Anshumathrayak (Love is a Confession)
 Dasin
 Ginidal
 Irunu Aththatu (2011)
 Piyawuna Deneth Nidimathin
 Sinhayo (for the 2011 Cricket World Cup)
 Ulkapathayak (Falling Star)

References

21st-century Sri Lankan male singers
1982 births
Living people
Sinhalese singers